= Specto =

- Developer(s): Jean-François Fortin Tam and Wout Clymans
- Final release: 0.4.1
- Operating system: Linux
- Website: specto.sourceforge.net

Specto is a free and open-source Linux application for watching web changes.
